Darron Bromley Wilkinson (born 24 November 1969) is an English former professional footballer who played as a midfielder in the Football League for Brighton & Hove Albion.

Life and career
Wilkinson was born in 1969 in Reading, Berkshire, and began his football career with Wokingham Town as a 13-year-old. He signed for Brighton & Hove Albion in 1992, and made 48 appearances in all competitions before being released two years later. After a season with Hong Kong First Division League club Kui Tan, he returned to England and joined Hayes, helping them win the 1995–96 Isthmian League title and with it promotion to the Conference. He made 203 appearances for the club, of which 115 were in the Conference, and captained the team in 1998–99, before moving on to another Conference club, Woking. He made 35 Conference appearances before joining Slough Town, where he was a regular in the team for seven seasons, including a year as player-coach and ten months as player-manager.

He continued his coaching career with clubs including Hayes & Yeading United's reserves, Beaconsfield SYCOB, Wokingham & Emmbrook, and Harrow Borough. Outside football, he works as a scaffolder.

Notes

References

1969 births
Living people
sportspeople from Reading, Berkshire
English footballers
Association football midfielders
Wokingham Town F.C. players
Brighton & Hove Albion F.C. players
Kui Tan players
Hayes F.C. players
Woking F.C. players
Slough Town F.C. players
Isthmian League players
English Football League players
Hong Kong First Division League players
National League (English football) players
Southern Football League players
English football managers
Slough Town F.C. managers